XHSCAI-FM is a community radio station on 107.3 FM in Santa Clara del Cobre, Michoacán. The station is owned by the civil association Mentes Que Piensan Manos Que Trabajan, A.C.

History
Comunicación y Cultura de Etzatlán 07 filed for a community station on October 3, 2016. The IFT approved its award on April 11, 2018.

References

Radio stations in Michoacán
Community radio stations in Mexico
Radio stations established in 2018